The 1991–92 Segunda Divisão season was the 58th season of the competition and the 42nd season of recognised third-tier football in Portugal.

Overview
The league was contested by 54 teams in 3 divisions with SC Campomaiorense, FC Felgueiras and Amora FC winning the respective divisional competitions and gaining promotion to the Liga de Honra.  The overall championship was won by SC Campomaiorense.

League standings

Segunda Divisão - Zona Norte

Segunda Divisão - Zona Centro

Segunda Divisão - Zona Sul

Footnotes

External links
 Portuguese Division Two «B» - footballzz.co.uk

Portuguese Third Division seasons
Port
3